The freshwater tyulka (Clupeonella tscharchalensis) is a species of fish in the herring family Clupeidae. It is found in the Caspian Sea watersheds, including the lower reaches of the rivers Volga and Ural. It was introduced to the Don River basin (Sea of Azov basin) and is also invasive upstream in the Volga drainage (Kama River). It is a small freshwater pelagic fish, up to 10 cm maximal length, inhabiting large lakes and reservoirs, and breeding in open water. Earlier it was considered to be a part of the species Clupeonella cultriventris (a variety or subspecies).

Sources

Clupeonella
Fish of Asia
Fish of Russia
Fish described in 1896